Arsenide chlorides or chloride arsenides are compounds containing anions composed of chloride (Cl−) and arsenide (As3−). They can be considered as mixed anion compounds. They are in the category of pnictidehalides. Related compounds include the arsenide bromides, arsenide iodides, phosphide chlorides, and antimonide chlorides.

List

References

Arsenides
Chlorides
Mixed anion compounds